The  was a Bo-Bo wheel arrangement electric locomotive type operated by private railway operator Nagoya Railroad (Meitetsu) in Japan.

Operations
Originally used to haul freight trains on the eastern end of the Meitetsu Nagoya Main Line and Meitetsu Mikawa Line, they were later used primarily on track maintenance trains and rolling stock transfer duties.

History
The two locomotives were built in 1930 and 1931 for the Aichi Electric Railroad, numbered DeKi 400 and DeKi 401. The locomotive bodies were built by Nippon Sharyo of Japan, and the electrical equipment was built by the American company Westinghouse Electric Company. When the Aichi Electric Railroad was absorbed into Meitetsu, the two locomotives retained their original DeKi 400 classification, but locomotive number DeKi 400 was renumbered DeKi 402.

Originally painted in black, the locomotives were repainted into "Meitetsu Blue" when they underwent life extension refurbishment in 1993. The locomotives were originally fitted with two large Westinghouse pantographs, but these were subsequently replaced by single PT42-F lozenge-type pantographs.

Withdrawal
The DeKi 400 locomotives were withdrawn during fiscal 2015, replaced by new Class EL120 locomotives, and cut up in June 2016.

References

1067 mm gauge locomotives of Japan
Electric locomotives of Japan
DeKi 400
1500 V DC locomotives
Railway locomotives introduced in 1930
Bo-Bo locomotives
Nippon Sharyo locomotives